Acknowledge, acknowledgment, or acknowledgement may refer to:

Arts, entertainment and media
 Acknowledgment (creative arts and sciences), a statement of gratitude for assistance in producing a work
 Acknowledgment index, a method for indexing and analyzing acknowledgments in the scientific literature
 "Acknowledgement" (song), a 1965 song from John Coltrane's album A Love Supreme

Technology
 Acknowledgement (data networks), a signal used to indicate acknowledgement
 ACK, a flag used in the Transmission Control Protocol (TCP) to acknowledge receipt of a packet

Other uses
 Acknowledgment (law), a declaration of one's own act, to give it legal validity
 Service of process, acknowledgment of service
 Acknowledgement of receipt, a postal service

See also
 ACK (disambiguation)
 Credit (creative arts), acknowledgment given to someone in the creative arts